Thesprotia filum, the grass mantis, is a species of mantis found in French Guiana, Suriname, and Trinidad.

References

Filum
Mantodea of North America
Mantodea of South America
Arthropods of South America
Fauna of French Guiana
Fauna of Suriname
Insects of Trinidad and Tobago
Insects described in 1796